The Norwegian Touring Car Championship (or NTCC) was held for three seasons between 2002 and 2004. The series used cars from the British Touring Car Championship and the Deutsche Tourenwagen Masters (DTM) that were built between 1987 and 1995. The series became inactive when it merged with the Swedish SSK series in 2005.

Champions

Touring car racing series
Motorsport in Norway
Touring